The Soubhan Allah Mosque is a mosque located in the Bab Souika arrondissement in Tunis, Tunisia. 
This mosque was built by the Andalusians, after settling in Tunis, and is dated to around 1624.

References

Mosques in Tunis
Religious buildings and structures completed in 1624
17th-century mosques
Spanish diaspora in Africa